Marullo is a surname of Italian origin. Notable people with the surname include:

 Cesare Marullo (died 1588), Italian Roman Catholic prelate, Archbishop of Palermo and Agrigento
 Giuseppe Marullo (died 1685), Italian painter of the Baroque period
 Louis Marullo (born 1954), American heavy metal singer, see Eric Adams (musician)
 Michael Tarchaniota Marullus (born 1458), Renaissance humanist scholar, poet, and soldier of Greek origin raised in Italy
 Noah Marullo (born 1999), British child actor

Italian-language surnames